General Donovan is a  department of Chaco Province in Argentina, named after General Antonio Donovan.

 from the national capital, Buenos Aires.

Settlements
La Escondida
La Verde
Lapachito
Makallé

References

Departments of Chaco Province